Gim Jeonggil (() may refer to:

Jung Kil Kim (born 1936), Korean-born martial arts practitioner
Kim Jung-gil (born 1986), South Korean para table tennis player

See also
Kim Jong-gil (1926–2017), South Korean poet